Weston is an unincorporated community located in McLean County, Illinois. It currently is still in existence, as opposed to its now-defunct namesake in DuPage County.

History

Weston was laid out 26 August 1867 by W. F. Bryan. The Original Town included 288 small lots, five blocks that were not subdivided and a Public Park. The depot and town hall were on the south side of the tracks. It was a station along the Toledo Peoria and Western Railroad. In 1895 there were four churches. Just east of town an area of natural tall grass prairie survives at Weston Cemetery Prairie.

References

Unincorporated communities in McLean County, Illinois
Unincorporated communities in Illinois
Populated places established in 1867